Derryadd is a hamlet and townland in County Armagh, Northern Ireland. It is within the Armagh City, Banbridge and Craigavon Borough Council area, on the southern shores of Lough Neagh. In the 2001 Census it had a population of 201 people.

Ardmore Primary School closed in 2006 due to low pupil numbers.

References

External links
NI Neighbourhood Information System

Townlands of County Armagh